Tadgh McElroy (born 16 June 1997) is an Irish rugby union player, currently playing for United Rugby Championship and European Rugby Champions Cup side Leinster. His preferred position is hooker.

Career
McElroy originally came through Connacht academy, before joining Saracens in 2017. His move to Saracens, saw him miss out on the 2017 U20 World Cup, and he remained with the club until 2019 before returning to Ireland, while spending a spell at Bedford Blues. McElroy returned to England in 2021, taking in spells at Bristol Bears, Ealing Trailfinders and London Irish, before joining Leinster on a short-term deal in October 2022.

References

External links
itsrugby.co.uk Profile

1997 births
Living people
People from Dundalk
Irish rugby union players
Saracens F.C. players
Bedford Blues players
Bristol Bears players
Ealing Trailfinders Rugby Club players
London Irish players
Leinster Rugby players
Rugby union hookers
Rugby union players from County Louth